Hugo Américo Lusardi Morínigo (17 August 1982 – 15 August 2022) was a Paraguayan professional footballer who played as midfielder.

Lusardi died of cancer on 15 August 2022, two days before his 40th birthday.

Honours
Libertad
 Paraguayan Primera División: 2008 Apertura, 2008 Clausura

Nacional
 Paraguayan Primera División: 2011 Apertura

Cobreloa
 Primera División de Chile: runner-up 2011 Clausura

References

External links
 
 
 Hugo Lusardi at Football-Lineups

1982 births
2022 deaths
People from Coronel Oviedo
Paraguayan footballers
Association football midfielders
Paraguayan Primera División players
Chilean Primera División players
Categoría Primera A players
General Caballero Sport Club footballers
Sportivo Luqueño players
Club Libertad footballers
Club Nacional footballers
Club Olimpia footballers
Club Tacuary footballers
Cobreloa footballers
Deportes Tolima footballers
Club Sol de América footballers
Club Rubio Ñu footballers
Deportivo Capiatá players
Club Deportivo Palestino footballers
Club Atlético 3 de Febrero players
Club Atlético Tembetary players
Paraguayan expatriate footballers
Paraguayan expatriate sportspeople in Chile
Expatriate footballers in Chile
Paraguayan expatriate sportspeople in Colombia
Expatriate footballers in Colombia

Deaths from cancer in Paraná (state)